Tatiana Lobo Wiehoff (13 November 1939 – 22 February 2023) was a Chilean-born Costa Rican author.

Lobo was born in Puerto Montt, Chile on 13 November 1939. She moved to Costa Rica in 1963 and remained there for the rest of her life. Her published works have crossed over several genres, including  novels, plays, short stories and articles. She has received several awards for her fiction, including the Sor Juana Inés de la Cruz Prize in 1995, Costa Rica's , and the Costa Rican Premio Academia Costarricense de la lengua. Her works have been translated into French, German, and English.

In her final years, Lobo secluded herself at her home in San Ramón, although she continued making social media  posts about local and international politics. Her final postings, in which she criticized Daniel Ortega and the Nicaraguan government's decision to strip the citizenship of 222 dissidents, were made four days before her death.

Lobo died on 22 February 2023, at the age of 83.

Bibliography
Tiempo de claveles (short stories, 1989) 
El caballero del V Centenario (play, 1989)
Asalto al paraíso (novel, 1992)  (translated by Asa Zatz as Assault on Paradise)
Entre Dios y el Diablo, mujeres de la Colonia (short stories, 1993), 
Calypso (novel, 1996) 
El año del laberinto (novel, 2000) 
Parientes en venta: la esclavitud en la Colonia (history, 2010) 
Candelaria del Azar (novel, 2010) 
El Corazón del silencio (novel 2011) 
El Puente de Ismael (novel, 2014) 
Te deam laudeamus (te alabamos, diosa) (poetry)

References

External links

1939 births
2023 deaths
Chilean emigrants to Costa Rica
Costa Rican women writers
People from Puerto Montt
Chilean women writers